Let the Bullets Fly is a 2010 Chinese action comedy film written and directed by Jiang Wen, based on a story by Ma Shitu. The film is set in Sichuan during the 1920s when the bandit Zhang (Jiang Wen) descends upon a town posing as its new governor. The film also stars Chow Yun-fat, Ge You, Carina Lau, Chen Kun and Zhou Yun.

The film's script went through over thirty drafts before Jiang Wen was happy with it. Let the Bullets Fly was originally to be released in September 2010 but was pushed back to December. Made in Mandarin and Sichuanese, the film broke several box office records in China, and has received critical acclaim, when it was released. Let the Bullets Fly grossed 674 million yuan (US$110 million) in Chinese box office (becoming the highest grossing domestic film in China until it was beaten by Painted Skin: The Resurrection in 2012) and $140 million worldwide.

Plot
Set in China during the warring 1920s, "Poxy" Zhang (张麻子; Jiang Wen) leads a group of bandits, each of whom is numbered rather than named, and ambushes a luxurious government tram engine and coach (curiously "pulled" by many horses) carrying Ma Bangde (马邦德; Ge You), who is on his way to Goose Town (鹅城 E-cheng) to assume the position of county governor.  Ma's train is derailed, killing both his bodyguards and his adviser, Counsellor Tang (汤师爷 Tang-shiye; Feng Xiaogang).  Ma has no money, having spent it all to bribe and buy his position.  To avoid being killed by Zhang's bandits, he lies to them claiming that he is Counsellor Tang and that his wife (Carina Lau) was the dead governor's wife.  He tells the bandits that, if they spare him and his wife, he will help Zhang to impersonate Ma and pilfer Goose Town's finances.

At Goose Town, Zhang's appointment is opposed by local mobster boss Master Huang (黄老爷 Huang-laoye; Chow Yun Fat), who lives in a fortified citadel.  Huang greets the governor's party by sending his best hat in a palanquin instead of himself.  Ma tells Zhang that previous governors would split with Huang the majority of taxes levied from the town residents. However, Zhang is not interested in taking money from the poor.

Champion Wu (武举人 Wu-juren; Jiang Wu), one of Huang's subordinates, severely injures a citizen, and as governor Zhang rules against Wu in the town court.  In retaliation, Huang frames Zhang's godson, Six (老六 Lao-liu), for theft.  Six kills himself in the process of proving his innocence.  Zhang vows to destroy Huang, but Ma advises him to use cunning rather than brute force.  Huang invites Zhang to a meal at his citadel, and there Huang pretends to have his subordinates killed as a sign of good faith.  Not realizing the governor is actually the bandit chief, Huang raises a plan to hunt down and kill Zhang Mazi.  Zhang pretends to agree to this plan, so long as Huang finances the expedition.

That night, Huang disguises his subordinates as Mazi's bandits and sends them to assassinate Zhang while he is asleep.  However, only Ma's wife is killed.  In grief, Ma reveals his true identity as governor to Zhang.  During the funeral for Ma's wife, Zhang has his bandits kidnap Huang and the heads of Goose Town's two leading families for ransom.  They quickly discover they have captured Huang's look-alike.  The town raises the ransom money but Zhang refuses to take it, instead returning it to the townsfolk.  As they do so, Flora (花姐 Huajie), a young prostitute in Huang's custody, discovers their identity.  She is captured by Zhang's gang but becomes friendly with Two (老二 Lao-er) and Three (老三 Lao-san) and later stays on as a bandit member, helping them to guard Huang's look-alike.  Huang sends his own subordinates, also disguised as bandits, to retrieve the money handed back to the town.

A random woman approaches Ma, claiming that he seduced her while in Shanxi, and that he is the father of her son. As compensation, Ma gives them two jewels.

Huang tries to kill Zhang again by sending subordinates to his house, disguised as masked bandits. The plan fails and Huang's men are shot to death. As such, Huang is forced to supply the money for Zhang's Anti Bandit Expedition. When Huang's steward obtains a portrait of the real Governor Ma, and Huang confronts Zhang, Ma confesses that he is the real governor, and pretends that Zhang is his nephew. As the Expedition goes ahead, Huang employs a fake Zhang Mazi to kill Zhang, and also sends men to plant a landmine on the road. In the ensuing battle, Two is killed, but the fake Zhang Mazi is captured. To avoid death, he offers Zhang two jewels, and admits that he obtained them by robbing and killing a woman and her son. Ma recognizes the jewels, and is filled with grief, and tries to travel to Shanxi, but drives over the landmine and is killed.

Zhang vows revenge and returns to Goose Town for a showdown with Huang.  He scatters money to the townsfolk and Huang gathers it up the next day; then Zhang scatters firearms to the townsfolk and prevents Huang from gathering them.  Zhang and his bandits put on a show of attacking the citadel, then publicly beheads Huang's look-alike to convince the townsfolk that Huang is dead and the one in the citadel is the look-alike. The townsfolk are reassured and storm the citadel with their new weapons.  Zhang gives Huang a gun with one bullet left for his own suicide.  However, a moment later, Huang stands on top of his own citadel and fires the gun into the air to get Zhang's attention.  He throws a hat better than the one he originally sent to greet Zhang off the roof, as he promised.  He then walks back into the citadel, killing himself with his own landmine.

Three intends to marry Flora and the surviving bandits leave for Shanghai to lead a more peaceful life.  They take the train through the mountains, Zhang riding after them.

Production
Director Jiang Wen went over 30 drafts of the film's script.

Parts of the filming were done on location in the Kaiping diaolou in Guangdong, China.

Release
Let the Bullets Fly was originally scheduled for a release in September 2010. The release date was postponed as a spokesperson for Emperor Motion Pictures stated that "There is a lot of post-production to be done and it has to be done properly." The film premiered in Beijing on December 6, 2010, with wide release in Mainland China on December 16. Let the Bullets Fly was released in Hong Kong on January 13, 2011. The film has become the highest grossing Chinese film, beating the record set by  Aftershock.  Following Avatar, this film is now the second highest-grossing film ever released in China.

Let the Bullets Fly had its American premiere at the Tribeca Film Festival in 2011. The festival's co-founder, Martin Scorsese, had a private screening of the film in August 2010 during post-production when he was visiting Beijing with his family.

Box office
The film's opening day gross was $4.5 million (RMB30m), which did not break the opening day record set by Feng Xiaogang's Aftershock. By the weekend, the film's accumulated grossed reached $19.52 million (RMB130.18m) and it became the local film fastest to break the RMB100m mark. Let the Bullets Fly earned a total of 400 million yuan (60 million US dollars) in its first 11 days of release.
It was scored 7.3 points on IMDB.

Critical reception
In China, Let the Bullets Fly won acclaim for story and dialogue as well as attracting criticism for its violence. John Anderson of Variety describes the film as "an entertaining hot pot of wry political commentary and general mischief" and adds that "genre fans in particular will find much to revel in, with Jiang being a helmer of sharp commercial instincts and a sage satirical bent."  Anderson further praised the film's visual style and composition, stating "While a generous portion of Let the Bullets Fly is dedicated to computerized chaos, explosions, and mayhem, the subtle is always in competition with the ostentatious." Anderson points out one lengthy scene involving a conversation between the three main characters "d.p. Zhao Fei's camera virtually floats around them, rotating, making mute commentary and suggesting the camerawork in Hou Hsiao-hsien's Flowers of Shanghai. Its captivating." Maggie Lee of The Hollywood Reporter described the film as "unabashedly entertaining" and though less tailored to film festivals than Jiang's other works, the bottom line is that it is a "rollicking Chinese western directed with cinematic gumption."

Film Business Asia gave the film an eight out of ten rating, calling it a "richly entertaining Oriental Western anchored by a well-honed, ironic script and terrific performances." Time Out Hong Kong called the acting "masterclass throughout" while noting that it may take a "native Chinese to fully appreciate." The Beijing Review said the film had "a great deal more depth to it than the average Hong Kong shoot-'em-up" and that it was as "captivating to listen to as it is to watch".  China Daily placed the film on their list of the best ten Chinese films of 2010. Twitch Film praised the film's tone and the script, stating "What is most refreshing about this tried and tested formula is Jiang's decision to play his film for laughs, and the script is littered with pitch-black humour throughout."

Awards and nominations

Let the Bullets Flys awards and nominations included Best Film and Directing nominations from the Asian Film Awards and the Asia Pacific Screen Awards.  Jiang also received the Best Director award from the Hong Kong Film Critics Society.

References

Further reading

External links
 
 
 Unofficial flash game
 Let the Bullets Fly at the Hong Kong Cinemagic

2010 films
2010s Mandarin-language films
Sichuanese-language films
2010 action comedy films
Chinese action comedy films
Hong Kong action comedy films
Films set in China
Films set in the 1920s
Films directed by Jiang Wen
Variance Films films
Films with screenplays by Zhu Sujin
2010 comedy films
2010s Hong Kong films